Pierre Baillargeon (November 8, 1812 – December 15, 1891) was a physician and political figure in Quebec. He sat for Stadacona division in the Senate of Canada from 1874 to 1891.

He was born in Île-aux-Grues, Lower Canada, the son of François Baillargeon and Marie-Louise Langlois dit Saint-Jean, and was educated at the Collège de Nicolet. Baillargeon received an MD from Harvard University. He was a member of the Boston Medical Society and a visiting physician at the Quebec General Hospital in Quebec City. In 1842, he married Geneviève, the daughter of Joseph Painchaud. Baillargeon died in office at the age of 79.

His brother Charles-François Baillargeon was archbishop of Quebec.

References 

1812 births
1891 deaths
Canadian senators from Quebec
Harvard Medical School alumni
Liberal Party of Canada senators